TX Digital Illusions was a video game developer located in Bryan, Texas.  It was formed in the mid 1980s by Gordon Walton, Mike Jones, Rob Brannon, Don Gilman and others from Applied Computing Services about 1986, a small IT service firm. It ended up merging into Three-Sixty Pacific about 1989.

Games
Sub Battle Simulator (Epyx) - Mac/PC/Atari 800/Amiga/Apple
PT-109 (Spectrum Holobyte) - Mac/PC
Shard of Spring (SSI) - PC
F-15 Strike Eagle (MicroProse) - Amiga
Harpoon (Three-Sixty Pacific) - PC/Mac

Companies based in Bryan, Texas
Defunct video game companies of the United States
Video game development companies